Nida or NIDA may refer to:

People
 Nida Allam (born 1993), American politician
 Nida Fazli (1938–2016), Indian Hindi and Urdu poet and lyricist
 Nida Eliz Üstündağ (born 1996), Turkish female swimmer
 Eugene Nida (1914–2011), American linguistics and translation scholar

Places
 Nida, Lithuania
 Nida, Oklahoma
 Nida, Świętokrzyskie Voivodeship, Poland
 Nida Plateau in Greece
 Nida (river) in Poland
 Nida (Roman town), an ancient Roman town in the northwestern suburbs of Frankfurt, Germany

Other uses
 Al Nida (newspaper), a defunct newspaper in Lebanon
 Al-Nida' (Kuwait), Kuwaiti newspaper
 Nida Civic Movement, a civic movement in Azerbaijan
 NIDA (political party), a political party in the Netherlands
 Nida, a character in the computer game Final Fantasy VIII
 Niddah, the Orthodox Jewish laws of family purity
 Typhoon Nida (disambiguation)
 National Institute of Development Administration, a graduate university in Bangkok, Thailand
 National Institute of Dramatic Art, Sydney, Australia
 National Institute on Drug Abuse, a branch of the National Institutes of Health in the United States
 National Internet Development Agency of Korea
 National Information Communications Technology Development Authority, Cambodia